Bertha Antoinetta Rochester (née Mason) is a character in Charlotte Brontë's 1847 novel Jane Eyre. She is described as the violently insane first wife of Edward Rochester, who moved her to Thornfield Hall and locked her in a room on the third floor.

In Jane Eyre 
Bertha Mason is the only daughter of a very wealthy family living in Spanish Town, Jamaica. The reader learns of her past not from her perspective but only through the description of her unhappy husband, Edward Rochester. She is described as being of Creole heritage. According to Rochester, Bertha was famous for her beauty: she was the pride of the town and sought after by many suitors. Upon leaving college, Rochester was persuaded by his father to visit the Mason family and court Bertha. As he tells it, he first meets her at a ball she attended with her father and brother Richard, where he was entranced by her loveliness. Despite never being alone with her, and supposedly having had scarcely any interaction or conversation with her, he married her for her wealth and beauty, and with fierce encouragement from his own father and the Mason family. Rochester and Bertha began their lives as husband and wife in Jamaica. In recounting the history of their relationship, Rochester claims, 

Rochester explains that he was not warned that violent insanity and intellectual disability ran in the Mason family and that the past three generations succumbed to  it. He assumed Bertha's mother to be dead and was never told otherwise, but she was locked away in an asylum. Bertha also had an intellectually disabled younger brother. Rochester's father knew of this but did not bother to tell his son, caring only about the vast fortune the marriage would bring him, and the Mason family clearly wanted Bertha off their hands as quickly as possible. Rochester asserts that Bertha's mental health deteriorated quickly, though it is unclear which form of mental illness she has. Her insane, violent behaviour becomes frightening to behold. Her laughter is described as "demonic", she crawls on all fours, snarling, and behaving in a bestial manner.

Rochester returns with her to England and has her imprisoned in a third-floor room off the gallery of his house for ten years with Grace Poole, a hired nurse who keeps her under control. Rochester travels abroad to forget his horrible marriage. However, Grace drinks sometimes, and Bertha manages to escape, causing havoc in the house: starting a fire in Mr Rochester's bed and biting and stabbing her visiting brother.

Rochester's marriage to Bertha eventually stands in the way of his marrying Jane Eyre, who is unaware of Bertha's existence and whom he truly loves. (He later admits to Jane that he once thought he loved Bertha). As Bertha is insane he cannot divorce her, due to her actions being uncontrollable and thus not legitimate grounds for divorce.  Years of violence, insanity, and confinement in an attic destroy Bertha's looks: when she sees Bertha in the middle of the night, Jane describes Bertha as looking "savage", even going so far as to compare her with a "German vampire". Bertha destroys Jane's wedding veil (an action that hints that Bertha is at least sane enough to be aware that her husband is planning to enter a bigamous marriage). Despite not loving her, Rochester attempts to save Bertha from a fire she starts in the house when she again escapes. Bertha dies after throwing herself off the roof, leaving her husband free to marry Jane.

Though her race is never mentioned, it is sometimes conjectured that she was of mixed race. Rochester suggests that Bertha's parents wanted her to marry him, because he was of "good race", implying that she was not pure white, while he was. There are also references to her "dark" hair, and "discoloured" and "black" face. A number of Victorian writers at the time suggested that madness could result from a racially "impure" lineage, compounded by growing up in a tropical West Indian climate.

Antoinette Cosway in Wide Sargasso Sea 
The 1966 parallel novel Wide Sargasso Sea by Jean Rhys serves as a prequel to Brontë's novel. It is the story of Mason (there called Antoinette Cosway) from the time of her youth in the Caribbean to her unhappy marriage and relocation to England. Rhys's novel re-imagines Brontë's devilish madwoman in the attic. Bertha serves as Jane's "double", juxtaposing the feminist character to a character constrained by domesticity.

In Wide Sargasso Sea, "Bertha Mason" is portrayed as being a false name for Antoinette Cosway. The book purports to tell Antoinette's side of the story, as well as Rochester's, and to account for how she ended up alone and raving in the attic of Thornfield Hall. According to the book, Antoinette's insanity and drunkenness are the result of Rochester's misguided belief that madness is in her blood and that she was part of the scheme to have him married blindly.
 
The characters of Jane Eyre and Antoinette are portrayed as being very similar; independent, vivacious, imaginative young women with troubled childhoods, educated in religious establishments and looked down on by the upper classes—and, of course, they both marry Mr Rochester. However, Antoinette is more rebellious than Jane and less mentally stable. She displays a deep vein of morbidity verging on a death-wish and, in contrast with Jane's overt Christianity, holds a cynical viewpoint of both God and religion in general.

References

External links 
Analysis of Bertha Mason at the British Library

Jane Eyre
Literary characters introduced in 1847
Drama film characters
Fictional gentry
Spanish Town
Fictional suicides
Fictional Jamaican people
Fictional characters with neurological or psychological disorders
Female characters in literature